Railway Estate is a suburb of Townsville in the City of Townsville, Queensland, Australia. In the  Railway Estate had a population of 2,852 people.

Geography 
Railway Estate is located on the south end of Ross Island, bounded by Ross Creek to the south-west and Ross River to the south-east. The suburb of South Townsville occupies the northern part of the island.

There is a large railway yard in the north of the suburb with the North Coast railway line entering the suburb from the south (Oonoonba) over Ross River and then splits with one branch exiting the suburb to the north-west (Townsville CBD) over Ross Creek and the other exiting to the north (South Townsville) to the Port of Townsville. As at March 2021, there are no operational railway stations within the suburb, but there were formerly a number of railway stations:

 Yenoor railway station
 Queens Road railway station
 Railway Estate railway station

History 
Close to the Townsville CBD and the  Port of Townsville, Railway Estate is one of the oldest residential communities in the city. The suburb's name reflects that all the land was originally owned by the Queensland Railways Department.

Railway Estate State School opened on 21 August 1916.

Townsville State High School opened on 7 July 1924.

In the 2011 census, Railway Estate had a population of 2,956 people.

In the  Railway Estate had a population of 2,852 people.

Education 
Railway Estate State School is a government primary (Prep-6) school for boys and girls at 39 Railway Avenue. In 2018, the school had an enrolment of 219 students with 19 teachers (14 full-time equivalent) and 16 non-teaching staff (9 full-time equivalent).

Townsville State High School is a government secondary (7-12) school for boys and girls at 36 Boundary Street. In 2018, the school had an enrolment of 790 students with 73 teachers (70 full-time equivalent) and 43 non-teaching staff (32 full-time equivalent). It includes a special education program, an intensive English language program, and a positive learning centre (to assist students whose learning requires intervention beyond what is possible in a conventional classroom).

Amenities 
There are a number of parks in the suburb, including:

 Bicentennial Park
 Dean Park

 Lou Lister Park

 National Park

 Railway Estate Park

 Reid Park

There are a number of boating facilities, including:

 Ross River Marina,  marina at the end of Samphire Road
 a boat ramp into the Ross River (downstream) and pontoon at Barnicle Street  managed by the Townsville City Council
 a boat ramp into the Ross River (upstream) and floating walkway at Barnicle Street managed by the Townsville City Council

There is also:
Off-leash, fenced dog area next to boat ramp
Council community gardens

Services 
Caltex 24 hours service station
OM Convenience
10th Avenue Convenience store
Railway Parade convenience store
Fish and chips
Ann Roberts School of Dance
Veika hair salon
Turnstyles hair salon
Pete Snell barber shop
Eves embroidery
Liquorland
Council community centre
Emergency day care
Veterinary clinic
Ross Island Hotel

Military 
Ross Island army barracks

References

External links
 

Suburbs of Townsville